The Seventh Government of the Lao People's Democratic Republic was established on 15 June 2011.

Ministries

Committees and others

References

Specific

Bibliography
Books:
 
 
 

Governments of Laos
2011 establishments in Laos
2016 disestablishments in Laos